Liubov Viktorovna Charkashyna (born December 23, 1987) is a retired Belarusian individual rhythmic gymnast. She is the 2012 Olympic all-around bronze medalist, and the 2011 European ball and clubs champion.

Competitive career 

Charkashyna started training in rhythmic gymnastics at a relatively late age, when she was nine years old. She made her senior international debut in 2003. She had a successful 2007 season, winning bronze in ribbon at the Grand Prix Final in Innsbruck, Austria.

Charkashyna competed at the 2008 Summer Olympics and placed 15th in qualifications. She did not advance to the top 10 finals round.

At the 2010 Grand Prix final in Berlin, Charkashyna won the silver medal in hoop and bronze medal in rope and ribbon final. 2011 marked her breakthrough season. She won the bronze all-around medal at the World Cup in Corbeil-Essonnes, as well as bronze in the all-around, ball and hoop at the 2011 World Cup series in Tashkent. On May 29, at the 2011 European Championships in Minsk, she became the only Belarusian senior gymnast to win two individual gold medals at one European Championship, winning the ball final and the clubs final against reigning World and Olympic champion, Evgenia Kanaeva. Charkashyna also won the bronze medal in the hoop finals.

Charkashyna was the bronze medalist in All-around at the 2011 Summer Universiade. At the 2011 World Championships held in Montpellier, France, she finished fourth in All-around and won bronze in the ball apparatus.

In the 2012 season, Charkashyna won gold in the individual ribbon finals at the World Cup in Tashkent, as well as silver (hoop) and bronze (ball). She placed fourth in All-around at the 2012 European Championships behind Aliya Garayeva. At the 2012 World Cup series held in Minsk, Belarus, she won the bronze medal in the All-around ahead of Russian gymnast Alexandra Merkulova who finished fourth.

At the 2012 Olympics, Charkashyna placed fifth in the qualifications with a score of 110.450. In the finals, she was able to edge out rival Aliya Garayeva for the bronze medal. After her final ribbon routine, she kissed the carpet. As soon as the overall scores appeared, she shed tears of joy when she saw that she had won the bronze medal with a total score of 111.700. Charkashyna said on winning her first Olympic medal: "I'm happy, very happy for my country and my coach and for rhythmic gymnastics in Belarus. I think it's a valuation of my hard work and my school in Belaraus. I don't think this medal is my medal, it's for the whole of Belarus."

Charkashyna retired from competition at the end of the 2012 season.

Later career 

Charkashyna worked as a rhythmic gymnastics coach and judge.  In 2013, she became an RSW brand ambassador. That same year, after the World Championships held in Kyiv, Ukraine, Charkashyna was elected as the rhythmic gymnastics representative on the FIG Athletes' Commission. Charkashyna held this position from 2014 to 2017. She then became the FIG Athletes' Commission president, for the term of 2017 to 2020. In 2019, Charkashyna commented on sexual abuse in gymnastics, saying that abuse is horrible, but she believes the problem is not widespread and some cases are "an opportunity to earn money."

Personal life 
Charkashyna is married to a former Belarusian football player, Victor Molashko.

On January 16, 2018, Charkashyna gave birth to baby girl, Vera.

Routine music information

Detailed Olympic results

References

External links
 
 
 

1987 births
Living people
Gymnasts from Minsk
Belarusian rhythmic gymnasts
Gymnasts at the 2008 Summer Olympics
Olympic gymnasts of Belarus
Gymnasts at the 2012 Summer Olympics
Olympic bronze medalists for Belarus
Olympic medalists in gymnastics
Medalists at the 2012 Summer Olympics
Medalists at the Rhythmic Gymnastics World Championships
Medalists at the Rhythmic Gymnastics European Championships
Universiade medalists in gymnastics
Universiade bronze medalists for Belarus
Medalists at the 2011 Summer Universiade
21st-century Belarusian women